An FXP board is an internet forum composed of members which distribute access to FTP servers or "pubstros". These forums are used to provide access to servers usually containing warez. FXP boards generally differ from other forums by having a very selective membership, typically opening public registration for a limited time and then closing until further notice.

There are several types of members of FXP boards, each with their own job:

 Scanners scan IP ranges for vulnerable computers with a fast Internet connection. Once a vulnerable system has been found, the information is passed on to the rest of the board and subsequently the "hackers".
 Hackers gain access to and install an FTP server on the systems the scanners have found using different tools depending on the vulnerability.
 Fillers add Warez to the FTP server, transferring files via FXP from other sources to the newly compromised servers once the "hackers" have posted the admin details for the FTP servers.

Most FXP boards have a time limit on the release time before the release can be posted as a "race". If the release is complete and posted after the pre limit it should be posted as a normal fill in a mirror section. If it is still posted in the race area it will be nuked and moved to the appropriate section.
 
FXP boards are the main reason for much activity on FTP servers, as the links are posted on multiple boards. Leechers soon exploit the servers, sometimes causing a huge slow-down due to consumed bandwidth.

See also
 FXP
 Topsite (warez)
 Warez scene

Warez